Frankford may refer to:

 Frankford, Tasmania, Australia
 Frankford, Ontario, Canada

United States
 Frankford, Delaware
Frankford, Baltimore, Maryland
 Frankford Township, Mower County, Minnesota
 Frankford Village, Minnesota, a ghost town which was in this township
 Frankford, Missouri
 Frankford Township, New Jersey
 Frankford, Philadelphia, Pennsylvania
 Frankford, West Virginia

See also
 
 Frankfort (disambiguation)
 Frankfurt (disambiguation)
 Frank Forde (1890–1983), Australian politician